Serhiy Datsenko (born 10 December 1977) is a Ukrainian former professional footballer.

Honours
Kudrivka
 Chernihiv Oblast Football Cup 2021
 Kyiv Oblast Football Federation: 2020
 Kyiv Oblast Football Cup: 2021

Avangard Korukivka 
 Chernihiv Oblast Football Champions: 2012, 2013
 Chernihiv Oblast Football Cup: 2013

Dynamo Kyiv 2
 Ukrainian First League: 2000–01

Dynamo Kyiv
 Ukrainian Premier League: 1996–97

References

External links
 

1977 births
Living people
Footballers from Chernihiv
Ukrainian footballers
SDYuShOR Desna players
FC Desna Chernihiv players
FC Dynamo Kyiv players
FC Metalurh Donetsk players
FC Kryvbas Kryvyi Rih players
FC Shakhtar Donetsk players
FC Rostov players
FC Akhmat Grozny players
FC Arsenal Kyiv players
FC Zorya Luhansk players
FC Avanhard Koriukivka players
FC Kudrivka players
Russian Premier League players
Ukrainian expatriate footballers
Expatriate footballers in Russia
Ukraine under-21 international footballers
Association football defenders